Jibanyan (ジバニャン), formerly Rudy (アカマル), is a main character and mascot in the multi-media franchise Yo-kai Watch. Designed by Akihiro Hino, Jibanyan is a cat-like Charming tribe Yo-kai who's, notably, shown a strong liking towards chocolate bars. Jibanyan has appeared in most Yo-kai Watch media, including the video games, the manga, and the TV-series.

Jibanyan first appeared in the Yo-kai Watch manga in December of 2012, only to appear in the video game seven months later in 2013.

Biography 
Prior to becoming a Yo-kai, Jibanyan (then named Rudy) was the pet cat of a young girl named Amy. One day, Rudy was run over by a truck. As Rudy was dying, he mistakenly thought he heard that Amy was disappointed with how easily he died, which caused Rudy (who had then become the Yo-kai Jibanyan) to actively fight trucks at an intersection in Uptown Springdale in order to make it up to Amy. One day, Jibanyan meets Nate Adams while fighting trucks at an intersection. After hearing that Adams believes Jibanyan was brave for his actions, the two form a friendship. Later, Jibanyan spends the majority of his time at Adams's house.

In a distant future from when the Yo-kai Watch games take place, Jibanyan is transformed into Robonyan (ロボニャン), a robotic version of himself.

Development 
Jibanyan's backstory of being run over by a truck is based on an actual event experienced by Level-5's CEO and designer of Jibanyan, Akihiro Hino, when he was a child. During Jibanyan's English localization, some people at Level-5 thought that Jibanyan's backstory of being hit by a car should be changed, however, Hino refused as he thought it was crucial to Jibanyan's story. Jibanyan's future robotic self, Robonyan's catchphrase is a reference to the T-800 Terminator from the Terminator franchise.

In an interview with Game Informer in 2015, Hino stated that Jibanyan was his favorite Yo-kai Watch character.

Merchandise and other appearances 

Hasbro released multiple toys featuring Jibanyan during their partnership with Level-5 from 2015 to 2016. Similarly, Bandai (who releases the Yo-kai Watch toys in Japan) have also released merchandise of Jibanyan. A licensed party board game based on Jibanyan was released by Megahouse in April 2015. The GameStop pre-orders for the first Yo-kai Watch game came with a Jibanyan pin. A limited edition Nintendo 3DS XL featuring Jibanyan was made available on July 10, 2014. A Jibanyan Nintendo 3DS theme was made available on My Nintendo on September 16, 2016. In January 2016, the chocolate bars Jibanyan eats in the series were physically released for a limited time.

Jibanyan appeared in the form of a mecha in the Nintendo 3DS game Little Battlers eXperience. Jibanyan was at the center of artwork for the 2014 holding of the World Hobby Fair. Jibanyan has appeared in multiple collaborations between Level-5 and the fast food company McDonald's. In 2015, Jibanyan was chosen as the kids goodwill ambassador of the Hawaii Tourism Board in Japan. In 2018, Jibanyan, along with other Level-5 characters, appeared as crossover characters in a Japan-only collaboration between Level-5 and Everybody's Golf. In 2019, Jibanyan and Lord Enma appeared as crossover characters in Monster Strike. Jibanyan was one of the 8 "Olympics Ambassadors" for the 2020 Summer Olympics. Jibanyan also appeared on merchandise promoting the event. In 2016, 2017, and 2020, Jibanyan and other Yo-kai Watch characters appeared as crossover characters in an event in Final Fantasy XIV.

Reception 
Jibanyan is widely considering "cute" and "adorable." Brian Ashcraft, writing for Kotaku, noted how Jibanyan was Yo-kai Watch's most popular character. Darren Nakamura of Destructoid listed Jibanyan as one of the best video game characters introduced in 2015. Niconico News ranked Jibanyan as the best character voiced by Etsuko Kozakura. Destructoid's Chris Carter praised the Jibanyan T variant of Jibanyan that debuted in Yo-kai Watch Busters 2. Nintendo Life praised the conversations that the player could have with Jibanyan when riding the train in Yo-kai Watch 2. GamesRadar+ stated that Jibanyan was one of their most wanted characters for the crossover fighting video game series Super Smash Bros.

References 

Anthropomorphic cats
Fictional yōkai
Ghost characters in video games
Male characters in video games
Video game characters introduced in 2013
Yo-kai Watch
Video game mascots